Rosemary, Lady Firth (1912 – 9 July 2001) was a British social anthropologist, and wife of Sir Raymond Firth.  She specialised in the field of domestic economy.

Life	
Rosemary Firth (née Upcott) was born in 1912. Her father was a distinguished official in the Treasury.  She took a Political Economy degree (MA) in Edinburgh in 1935, and then moved to London.  She married Raymond Firth in 1936, and accompanied him to Malaya to undertake fieldwork from 1939 to 1940. She focussed on the domestic economy of the female villagers, resulting in the publication of Housekeeping among Malay Peasants in 1943.

She worked as a lecturer in health education at the University of London Institute of Education for many years, whilst continuing her anthropological research interests.

Her son Hugh was born in 1946.  When her husband was knighted in 1973, Rosemary Firth took the title Lady Firth.  She died in 2001. Following her death, Sir Raymond established The Rosemary and Raymond Firth Award in the Department of Anthropology at the London School of Economics.  This award has the specific aim of promoting Rosemary’s interest in 'the anthropology of household management and the organisation of domestic affairs'.

Selected bibliography
 Housekeeping among Malay Peasants (1943)  
 'From Wife to Anthropologist' in Crossing Cultural Boundaries: The Anthropological Experience (eds) Solon Kimball and James B Watson San Francisco: Chandler, 10-32 (1972)
 'The Best Circle: Society, Etiquette and the Season' Sociology 8(2):339-340 (1974)
 'Anthropologists in the Lions' Den?' Current Anthropology 17(4):770-771 (1976)
 'Cooking in a Kelantan Fishing Village, Malaya' in The Anthropologist’s Cookbook (ed) Jessica Kuper New York: Universe (1977)
 'Mad Dogs, Englishmen and the Errant Anthropologist: Field Work in Malaysia' Journal of the Royal Anthropological Institute 3(4):795-796 (1997)

Other sources
 Hardiman, Margaret, 'A memory of Rosemary Firth' Anthropology Today 18(1):23 (2002)

External links
Interviewed by Alan Macfarlane 8 July 1983 (poor quality video)

British women anthropologists
Social anthropologists
1912 births
2001 deaths
People associated with the London School of Economics
Alumni of the University of Edinburgh